Oxana Yatskaya (born 22 September 1978 in Urzhar) is a Kazakhstani cross-country skier who has been competing since 1995. She finish fifth in the team sprint at the FIS Nordic World Ski Championships 2007 in Sapporo and earned her best individual finish of eighth in the 30 km event at the 2005 championships in Oberstdorf.

Yatskaya's best individual finish at the Winter Olympics was 15th twice (5 km + 5 km combined pursuit: 2002, 30 km: 2006).

She has a total of three individual FIS race victories up to 10 km since 1996. Yatskaya's best individual World Cup finish was sixth in a sprint event in February 2010 in Canada.

References

External links
 
 

1978 births
Living people
People from Urzhar District
Cross-country skiers at the 1998 Winter Olympics
Cross-country skiers at the 2002 Winter Olympics
Cross-country skiers at the 2006 Winter Olympics
Cross-country skiers at the 2010 Winter Olympics
Kazakhstani female cross-country skiers
Tour de Ski skiers
Olympic cross-country skiers of Kazakhstan
Asian Games medalists in cross-country skiing
Cross-country skiers at the 1996 Asian Winter Games
Cross-country skiers at the 2003 Asian Winter Games
Cross-country skiers at the 2007 Asian Winter Games
Cross-country skiers at the 2011 Asian Winter Games
Asian Games gold medalists for Kazakhstan
Asian Games silver medalists for Kazakhstan
Asian Games bronze medalists for Kazakhstan
Medalists at the 1996 Asian Winter Games
Medalists at the 2003 Asian Winter Games
Medalists at the 2007 Asian Winter Games
Medalists at the 2011 Asian Winter Games
Universiade medalists in cross-country skiing
Universiade silver medalists for Kazakhstan
Competitors at the 2003 Winter Universiade
21st-century Kazakhstani women